Jijian (also Romanized as Jījīān, Jījeyān, and Jijiyan) is a village in Ramkan Rural District, in the Central District of Qeshm County, Hormozgan Province, Iran. At the 2006 census, its population was 516, in 112 families.

References 

Populated places in Qeshm County